The Derby della Lanterna, Italian for the "Derby of the Lantern", is Genoa's local derby, played by Genoa C.F.C and U.C. Sampdoria. It takes place at the Stadio Luigi Ferraris, which both clubs share.

Background
The derby's name is derived from the Torre della Lanterna, the ancient landmark and the main lighthouse for the city's port.

The rivalry is fueled by the fact that Genoa has a long history, being Italy's oldest football club, while Sampdoria is the country's newer continuously operating club.

It is the oldest derby in Italian football with the first match being played in 1902, when Sampdoria were known as Andrea Doria. 49 matches were played in total between Genoa and this incarnation of Sampdoria, with the former emerging with 30 victories in all competitions, with only eight wins for Andrea Doria.

In 1946, a merger occurred between Sampierdarenese and Andrea Doria to form Sampdoria and the current incarnation of the rivalry began.  The first match between Sampdoria and Genoa was held in November 1946 with 45,000 fans and the President of the Republic Enrico De Nicola in attendance. The upstarts Sampdoria won 3–0 as Giuseppe Baldini scored the first goal with a long-range thunderbolt that was so good that Genoa’s Juan Carlos Verdeal went to shake his hand after it crossed the line.

Statistics

As of 30 April 2022

Results

League matches
Dates are in dd/mm/yyyy form.

Cup matches

Head-to-head ranking in Serie A (1930–2022)

• Total: Genoa with 16 higher finishes, Sampdoria with 30 higher finishes (as of the end of the 2021–22 season).

Notes:
 Genoa finished 12th in their group and did not qualify for the final round of 8 teams in 1946

Honours

Chronological order of honours

Table correct as of 29 November 2017.

References

Lanterna
Genoa C.F.C.
U.C. Sampdoria